An investor is a person who allocates financial capital with the expectation of a future return (profit) or to gain an advantage (interest). Through this allocated capital most of the time the investor purchases some species of property. Types of investments include equity, debt, securities, real estate, infrastructure, currency, commodity, token, derivatives such as put and call options, futures, forwards, etc. This definition makes no distinction between the investors in the primary and secondary markets.  That is, someone who provides a business with capital and someone who buys a stock are both investors.  An investor who owns stock is a shareholder.

Types of investors
There are two types of investors: retail investors and institutional investors.

Retail investor
 Individual investors (including trusts on behalf of individuals, and umbrella companies formed by two or more to pool investment funds)
 Angel investors (individuals and groups)
 Sweat equity investor

Institutional investor
 Pension plans making investments on behalf of employees
 Businesses that make investments, either directly or via a captive fund
 Endowment funds used by universities, churches, etc.
 Mutual funds, hedge funds, and other funds, ownership of which may or may not be publicly traded (these funds typically pool money raised from their owner-subscribers to invest in securities)
 Sovereign wealth funds
 Large money managers

Investors might also be classified according to their profiles. In this respect, an important distinctive investor psychology trait is risk attitude.

Investor protection
The term "investor protection" defines the entity of efforts and activities to observe, safeguard and enforce the rights and claims of a person in his role as an investor. This includes advice and legal action.  The assumption of a need of protection is based on the experience that financial investors are usually structurally inferior to providers of financial services and products due to lack of professional knowledge, information or experience. Countries with stronger investor protections tend to grow faster than those with poor investor protections.  Investor protection includes accurate financial reporting by public companies so the investors can make an informed decision.  Investor protection also includes fairness of the market which means all participants in the market have access to the same information.

Through government
Investor protection through government involve regulations and enforcement by government agencies to ensure that market is fair and fraudulent activities are eliminated.  An example of a government agency that provides protection to investors is the U.S. Securities and Exchange Commission (SEC), which works to protect reasonable investors in the United States.

Investment tax structures
Company dividends are paid from after-tax profits, with the tax already deducted. Therefore, shareholders are given some respite with a preferential tax rate of 15% on "qualified dividends" in the event of the company being domiciled in the United States. Alternatively, in another country having a double-taxation treaty with the US, accepted by the IRS;. Non-qualified dividends paid by other foreign companies or entities; for example, those receiving income derived from interest on bonds held by a mutual fund, are taxed at the regular and generally higher rate of income tax. When applied to 2013, this is on a sliding scale up to 39.6%, with an additional 3.8% surtax for high-income taxpayers ($200,000 for singles, $250,000 for married couples).

Role of the financier

A financier is a person whose primary occupation is either facilitating or directly providing investments to up-and-coming or established companies and businesses, typically involving large sums of money and usually involving private equity and venture capital, mergers and acquisitions, leveraged buyouts, corporate finance, investment banking, or large-scale asset management. A financier makes money through this process when his or her investment is paid back with interest, from part of the company's equity awarded to them as specified by the business deal, or a financier can generate income through commission, performance, and management fees. A financier can also promote the success of a financed business by allowing the business to take advantage of the financier's reputation. The more experienced and capable the financier is, the more the financier will be able to contribute to the success of the financed entity, and the greater reward the financier will reap. The term, financier, is French, and derives from finance or payment.

Financier is someone who handles money. Certain financier avenues require degrees and licenses including venture capitalists, hedge fund managers, trust fund managers, accountants, stockbrokers, financial advisors, or even public treasurers. Personal investing on the other hand, has no requirements and is open to all by means of the stock market or by word of mouth requests for money. A financier "will be a specialized financial intermediary in the sense that it has experience in liquidating the type of firm it is lending to".

Perceptions
Economist Edmund Phelps has argued that the financier plays a role in directing capital to investments that governments and social organizations are constrained from playing:

The concept of the financier has been distinguished from that of a mere capitalist based on the asserted higher level of judgment required of the financier. However, financiers have also been mocked for their perceived tendency to generate wealth at the expense of others, and without engaging in tangible labor. For example, humorist George Helgesen Fitch described the financier as "a man who can make two dollars grow for himself where one grew for some one else before".

See also

 Business magnate
 Businessperson
 Compound interest
 Crowd funding
 Financial literacy
 Growth capital
 Model audit
 Philanthropy
 Real estate investor
 Saving account
 Securities market participants (United States)
 Securities offering
 Socially responsible investing
 Stock investor
 Time value of money
 Usury

Further reading

References

External links
 

Finance occupations
Financial services occupations
Investment funds
Investors